Western Regional Hospital is the biggest public hospital in Gandaki Province and is located in Ramghat, Ward 10 of Pokhara. The hospital was upgraded to an academy of health sciences in 2015 and now has a teaching hospital called Pokhara Academy of Health Sciences.

References

Hospitals in Pokhara